Bulolo Airport  is an airfield serving Bulolo, in the Morobe Province of Papua New Guinea.

Airlines and destinations

References

External links
 

Airports in Papua New Guinea
Morobe Province